Heliaia or Heliaea (Doric: Ἁλία Halia) was the supreme court of ancient Athens. The view generally held among scholars is that the court drew its name from the ancient Greek verb , which means congregate. Another version is that the court took its name from the fact that the hearings were taking place outdoors, under the sun. Initially, this was the name of the place where the hearings were convoked, but later this appellation included the court as well.

The judges were called heliasts or dikastes (= those who have sworn, namely the jurors). The operation of judging was called .

Institution and composition of Heliaia
It is not clear whether Heliaia was instituted by Cleisthenes or Solon, but it seems that the latter initiated a function of the Assembly to sit as an appeals court. The court had 6,000 members, chosen annually by lot among all the male citizens over 30 years old, unless they were disfranchised. Those suffering from intellectual or corporeal flaws were also excepted, if their shortages prevented them from fully perceiving the proceedings. If any unqualified person participated in a jury, then information was laid against him and he was brought before the Heliaia. If convicted the court could assess against him whatever punishment or fine he was thought to deserve. If the punishment was a money fine, then the infringer had to go to prison until he had paid both the former debt, for which the information was laid, and whatever additional sum had been imposed on him as a fine by the court.

Appointment of the jurymen
The public office of the heliast was not obligatory, but the citizens who wished to exert these duties had to submit a petition. Jurors were paid a salary;  originally one obol per day and later, at the instigation of Kleon probably in 425 BC three obols, i.e. half a drachma.  According to Aristotle, "Pericles first made service in the jury-courts a paid office, as a popular counter-measure against Cimon's wealth".

The 6,000 were drawn from the 10 tribes (each tribe offering 600 members) and they were then divided into chambers of 600 jurymen, 500 or 501 of whom were regular members, with the rest constituting alternate jurors. In exceptional cases the court could go into plenary sessions. Sometimes, the chambers had 201 to 401 members or 1001 to 1501 members. After the selection by lot, the heliasts had to take the Heliastic Oath once every year. After the swearing-in, the jurors received one box-wood ticket, with their own names and that of their father and deme written on it, and one letter of the alphabet as far as kappa and the jurors of each tribe were divided into ten sections, approximately an equal number under each letter.

Jurisdiction
Initially, the Heliaia's jurisdiction was limited to judging the archons and, probably, some other similar accusations against public office-holders. It was when Ephialtes and  Pericles prompted a binding resolution through the ecclesia, stripping the Areios Pagos of most of the cases it judged, that the Heliaia started judging almost all the civil and penal cases. The Areios Pagos kept its competence only for the crimes of murder and arson, while the archons could impose some minor fines. The Heliaia's jurisdiction also included litigation which involved Athenians and citizens of other cities or Athens and another city as subjects of international law. Namely, the Heliaia functioned as a court for litigation of public, criminal and private international law.

Taking the jurisdiction over the so-called graphe paranomon, the Heliaia replaced the Areios Pagos in the execution of the legal control of the decisions of the ecclesia. Until Ephialtes' reforms the Areios Pagos had the duty of guarding the laws and to keep watch over the greatest and the most important of the affairs of state.

Procedure
The Heliaia was in session every normal day, except for the three last days of each month and for the days during which the ecclesia was in session. The sessions took place in the open within a marked-off area, since there was no specific building where they could be lodged. The location of the hearing was confined within a special hedge, outside of which the audience could stand. The details of the legal procedure were as follows:

The hegemon (ἡγεμών) of the court was responsible for the registration of the suits and complaints. After holding a preliminary investigation, he also had to subpoena the litigant parties and the witnesses before the jury. In the morning of the day of hearings, the hegemon had to determine by lot the jury that would judge the case as well as the place where it would convene. After the formation of the jury, the hegemon had to submit the conclusions of his preliminary investigation, announcing and defining the litigation on which the court should decide. Then it was the time for the plaintiff, the defendant and the witnesses to be heard. The arguments were exposed by the litigants themselves, without the legal support of a lawyer, in the form of an exchange of single speeches timed by water clock. In a public suit each litigant had three hours to speak, whereas they had much less in private suits (though here it was in proportion to the amount of money at stake). In this way the judicial cases became a vehement fight of impressions, since the jurors did not constitute a little group of mature citizens, such as the Court of Areios Pagos, which was interested only in the correct application of the law. Additionally, before the Chambers of Heliaia each citizen had to become an effective orator and to act solely in his capacity as citizen, in order to protect his interests and to enforce his views.

Decisions were made by voting without any time set aside for deliberation. Nothing, however, stopped jurors from talking informally among themselves during the voting procedure and juries could be unruly, shouting out their disapproval or disbelief of things said by the litigants. This may have had some role in building a consensus. The voting procedure was public and transparent. Each heliast had received two votes, one "not guilty" and one "guilty". Then the herald (κήρυξ) would, first, ask the heliasts if they wanted to submit any objections against the witnesses and, then, he would call them to cast their votes in two different amphoras, one of copper for the "non-guilty" votes and one of wood for the "guilty" votes. The voting was secret, since each juror had to cover the vote with his fingers, so that nobody could see in which amphora he threw it. In the civil cases the voting procedure was different, because the amphoras were as many as the litigant parties and the jurors had to vindicate one of them by casting their vote.

After the votes were counted, the herald announced the final result. In cases of a tie, the defendant was acquitted, because he was thought to have got "the vote of Athena".

Sentences
Heliasts could impose either fines (for civil and penal cases) or "corporeal sentences" (only for penal cases). The fines of Heliaia were higher than the fines of the archons. The lato sensu "corporeal sentences" included death, imprisonment (for the non-Athenian citizens), atimia (sometimes along with confiscation) and perpetual exile.

Famous trials before the Heliaia

Socrates' trial

Socrates was accused of asebeia (impiety) by Meletus, Anytus and Lycon. His trial took place in 399 BC and the jury found him guilty with 280 votes to 220. His death sentence was decided in a second round of voting, which was even worse for the philosopher. Nonetheless, Socrates did not lose his calm demeanor and, although during the trial he could propose to the jury his self-exile, he did not do it when his friends offered to help him flee afterward, since life away from his beloved city was pointless for him.

Pericles' trial
According to Plutarch, Pericles faced, twice, serious accusations. The first one was just before the eruption of the Peloponnesian War and the second one was during the first year of the war, when he was punished with a fine, the amount of which was either fifteen or fifty talents. Before the war a bill was passed, on the motion of Dracontides, according to which Pericles should deposit his accounts of public moneys with the prytanes and the jurors should decide upon his case with ballots which had lain upon the altar of the goddess on the acropolis. This clause of the bill was however amended with the motion that the case be tried before fifteen hundred jurors in the ordinary way, whether one wanted to call it a prosecution for embezzlement and bribery, or malversation.

Location 
The name "Heliaia" has often been attached to a large unroofed rectangular enclosure at the southwestern corner of the Classical Agora of Athens. The identification was tentatively suggested by the excavator when the structure was discovered in the 1950s, but in the absence of any positive evidence to support it, he admitted that it was "nothing more than a likely hypothesis." For lack of a better suggestion the name became widely used and appeared on plans of the site, but the uncertainty remained, and in a comprehensive final publication of the lawcourts in the Athenian Agora, published in 1995, the structure was referred to simply as the "Rectangular Peribolos," a neutral descriptive label that assumed no specific identification. A few years later, a thorough review of the question, prompted by new epigraphical evidence, led to the suggestion that the enclosure was in fact the Aiakeion, a shrine dedicated to the hero Aiakos of Aegina, and this identification has since been widely accepted. The location of the Heliaia itself remains unknown.

See also
Areopagus
Athenian democracy
Atimia (loss of citizen rights)
Attic calendar
Boule
Ecclesia (ancient Athens)
Graphe paranomon
History of Athens
Law court (ancient Athens)

Notes
     α.    In Argos the place where its court was seated was also called .

     β.    Sun =  and the  verb  (passive voice) = enjoy the sun.

     γ.    According to Mogens Herman Hansen, The Athenian Ecclesia: A Collection of Articles 1983-1989, page 260, "apart from Plutarch, who quotes the Ath. Pol., there is no other evidence that the heliaia was a court of appeal, and the scanty contemporary sources indicate that it was a court of first instance."

     δ.    When certain chambers were merged. This was the case of Pericles' trial.

     ε.    The cases of private international law were initially judged by the session of the Athenian alliance in Delos.

     στ.    This was not a judge or a juror, but a kind of archon, chosen by lot or by ordination for about a month.

     ζ.   That is why the profession of the logographer, or professional speechwriter, such as Lysias, flourished in ancient Athens.

Citations

References
Primary sources
Andocides, Speeches. See original text in Perseus program.
Aristophanes, Wasps. See original text in Perseus program.
Aristotle, Constitution of Athens. See original text in Perseus program.
Aristotle, Politics. See original text in Perseus program.
Demosthenes, On the Crown. See original text in Perseus program.
Plutarch, Pericles. See original text in Perseus program.

Secondary sources
Cambridge University Press, Archaic Times to the End of the Peloponnesian War, 1983.
Encyclopaedic Dictionary The Helios, article Heliaia (in Greek).
Mogens Herman Hansen, The Athenian Ecclesia: A Collection of Articles 1983-1989, 1989.
Konstantinos Paparrigopoulos, History of the Hellenic Nation, Volume Ab (in Greek).
R.K Sinclair, Democracy and Participation in Athens, 1991.
Georg Friedrich Schömann, A Dissertation on the Assemblies of the Athenians, Cambridge, 1838.
Stephen Usher, The Orations in Ancient Attica in The Orations in the Modern Educational Systems, Editions: Grigoris, 1984 (translated in Greek).

External links

Athenian Democracy in Action: The Pnyx, the Bouleuterion, the Prytaneion, and the Heliaia
Criminal Procedure in Ancient Greece and the Trial of Socrates
Historical Overview
Panagiotis Chaloulos, Legislative provisions 
Yannis Panagiwtopoulos, The Athenian Democracy 
Michael Sakelariou, The Athenian Democracy
E.M. Soulis, Thucydides and his political and intellectual environment 

Ancient Greek law
Athenian democracy

fr:Démocratie athénienne#L'Héliée